Monica Lin Brown (born 24 May 1988) is a United States Army sergeant and medic who became the first woman during the War in Afghanistan and only the second woman since World War II to receive the Silver Star, the United States military's third-highest medal for valor in combat.

Career
In April 2007, after a roadside bomb detonated near a convoy of Humvees in the eastern Paktia Province of Afghanistan, Private First Class Brown saved the lives of fellow soldiers by running through insurgent gunfire to reach the wounded and then using her body to shield them while mortar rounds fell nearby. Because women were not formally allowed to participate directly in combat at the time, Brown was pulled back to the base at Khost shortly after the incident.

Brown, who joined the Army at age 17, was presented with the Silver Star by Vice President Dick Cheney in a ceremony on 21 March 2008.

Military awards
Brown's military decorations and awards include:

Silver Star

Citation:

See also

Leigh Ann Hester
Monica Beltran

References

External links

1988 births
Living people
United States Army personnel of the War in Afghanistan (2001–2021)
Combat medics
People from Lake Jackson, Texas
Recipients of the Silver Star
United States Army non-commissioned officers
Women in 21st-century warfare
Women in the United States Army
Women in war in South Asia